Ferndale Dairies was a dairy products business located at 11 West 42nd Street in Manhattan, in the U.S. state of New York. The firm was incorporated in December 1930. The company purchased its milk in Delaware County, New York.

See also
 List of dairy product companies in the United States

References

Food and drink companies established in 1930
Dairy products companies of the United States
Defunct companies based in New York City
1930 establishments in New York (state)